Viscount Blakenham, of Little Blakenham in the County of Suffolk, is a title in the Peerage of the United Kingdom. It was created in 1963 for the Conservative politician and former Secretary of State for War, John Hare. He was the third son of Richard Hare, 4th Earl of Listowel (see Earl of Listowel for earlier history of the family).  the title is held by his grandson, the third Viscount, a professor at MIT who succeeded his father, a former chairman of Pearson PLC, in that year. As a great-grandson of the fourth Earl of Listowel, he is also in remainder (as of 2018 second in line) to this peerage and its subsidiary titles.

Viscounts Blakenham (1963)
John Hugh Hare, 1st Viscount Blakenham (1911–1982)
Michael John Hare, 2nd Viscount Blakenham (1938–2018)
Caspar John Hare, 3rd Viscount Blakenham (born 1972)

The heir apparent is the present holder's son, Hon. Inigo Hare.

See also
Earl of Listowel

Notes

References
Kidd, Charles, Williamson, David (editors). Debrett's Peerage and Baronetage (1990 edition). New York: St Martin's Press, 1990, 

Viscountcies in the Peerage of the United Kingdom
Noble titles created in 1963
Noble titles created for UK MPs